Two vessels of the British Royal Navy have been named Juniper for the juniper:

 was a  launched at Bermuda. She participated in one campaign for which her crew was awarded the Naval General Service Medal (1847) with clasp "San Sebastian". She also participated in the capture of several merchant ships. The  Navy sold her in 1814.
 was a Tree-class minesweeping trawler launched in 1939. The German  heavy cruiser  sank her on 8 June 1940 in the Norwegian Sea.

Royal Navy ship names